The Piedmont Park Apartments (known today as Wilburn House condominiums) in Midtown Atlanta, Georgia was built in 1911 and was designed by Leila Ross Wilburn, Georgia's first female architect.

The building is listed on the National Register of Historic Places, and is also designated as a historic building by the City of Atlanta.

Construction
The building was designed by Wilburn in the Craftsman style popular in the early 1900s.

History
The apartments were generally middle-class in nature and remained that way from first occupancy through the 1990s. In 2000, the building was restored and sold as condominiums along with two new neighboring buildings, all comprising the newly named three-building Wilburn House condominiums.

References

External links
 Condo association history

1911 establishments in Georgia (U.S. state)
Apartment buildings in Atlanta
National Register of Historic Places in Atlanta
Residential buildings completed in 1911